Colchester is a town in the Eastern Cape province of South Africa. It forms part of the Nelson Mandela Bay Metropolitan Municipality which governs Gqeberha and surrounding towns and suburbs.

Geography
The small town of Colchester lies about 40 kilometres north-east of Port Elizabeth (since 2021 renamed Gqeberha). It also lies on the N2 about 20 minutes from Port Elizabeth and an 1 hour from Makhanda.

It lies on the banks of the Sundays River and the south-eastern border of the Sundays River Valley region.

References

Populated places in Nelson Mandela Bay